The 1940 season of the Peruvian Primera División, the top category of Peruvian football, was played by 8 teams. The national champions were Deportivo Municipal. From 1931 until 1942 the points system was W:3, D:2, L:1, walkover:0.

Results

Standings

Liguilla de promoción

Relegation play-off 
Because Telmo Carbajo and Santiago Barranco tied with 6 points a relegation play-off on neutral ground will be played as the tournament rules specify.

External links 
 Peru 1940 season at RSSSF
 Peruvian Football League News 

Peru1
Peruvian Primera División seasons
1